Lokichogio Airport is an airport in Lokichogio, Kenya.

Location
Lokichogio Airport  is located in Turkana County, in the town of Lokichogio, in the northwestern corner of the Republic of Kenya, close to the International borders with South Sudan and Uganda.

Overview
Lokichogio Airport is a civilian airport that serves the town of Lokichogio and surrounding communities. The airport is home to one of the world's largest and longest running humanitarian aid projects. Global aid projects are run by aid groups such as the United Nations, UNICEF, and The World Food Program to the neighbouring country of South Sudan. The airport is now home to a number of different aircraft ranging from the Lockheed Hercules to the de Havilland DHC-5 Buffalo. Many of the charities based at Lokichoggio work in collaboration with the Sudanese People's Liberation Army (SLPA), the armed forces of the Republic of South Sudan.

Airlines and destinations

Accidents and incidents
On 7 November 1993, Aero Modifications International DC-3-65TP ZS-KCV of Professional Aviation Services, was damaged beyond repair in a take-off accident.

See also
 Kenya Airports Authority
 Kenya Civil Aviation Authority
 List of airports in Kenya
 Lokichogio
 Rift Valley Province
 Turkana District

References

External links

 Location of Lokichogio Airport At Google Maps
 Kenya Airports Authority - Lokichoggio Airport

Airports in Kenya
Airports in Rift Valley Province
Turkana County